The Liguilla of the 2012 Liga MX Apertura was the final knockout tournament involving eight teams of the Liga MX. The tournament began on November 14, 2012 and ended on December 12, 2012. The winners and runners-up of the competition qualified for the 2013–14 CONCACAF Champions League.

Teams
The eight best teams in the general table qualified for the competition.

Bracket
The eight qualified teams play two games against each other on a home-and-away basis. The winner of each match up is determined by aggregate score.

The teams were seeded one to eight in quarterfinals, and will be re-seeded one to four in semifinals, depending on their position in the general table. The higher seeded teams play on their home field during the second leg.

 If the two teams are tied after both legs, the higher seeded team advances.
 Both finalist qualify to the 2013–14 CONCACAF Champions League Group Stage.

Quarter-finals
The first legs of the quarterfinals were played on November 14 and 15. The second legs were played on November 17 and 18.

Kickoffs are given in local time (UTC-6 unless stated otherwise).

First leg

Second leg

Semi-finals
The first legs of the semifinals were played on November 22 and November 25. The second legs were played on December 3 and 4.

Kickoffs are given in local time (UTC-6 unless stated otherwise).

First leg

Second leg

Final

The first leg of the final was played on November 29, the second leg on December 2.

Kickoffs are given in local time (UTC-6 unless stated otherwise).

First leg

Second leg

References

Aper